Gokulananda Tourism Center, also known as (Gokulananda picnic spot), is a tourism center situated in Sidhamula village, in Nayagarh, Odisha. Many people come here to see the scenic beauty of this spot and for picnic purposes mainly from the months of October to March.

This center is situated on the bank of river Mahanadi. The tourism center consists of Gokulananda temple, an attached picnic area. The temple is on the top of the hill. It is founded by late Sri Baba Swami Ram Laxman Dash Maharaja. It is nice to watch the panoramic view of the hill and flowing water of Mahanadi from the hill as well as from Sidhamula bridge. The hill is full of tall trees and medicinal plants. There is nearly 1 km of plane surface full of greenery on bottom of the hill on the bank of river Mahanadi suitable for cooking as well as playing games which attracts most of the local and nearby district tourists to this place.

References

Nayagarh district